Caught Bluffing is a 1922 American drama film directed by Lambert Hillyer and written by Charles Sarver. The film stars Frank Mayo, Edna Murphy, Wallace MacDonald, Jack Curtis, Andrew Arbuckle, and Ruth Royce. The film was released on September 18, 1922, by Universal Film Manufacturing Company.

Cast          
Frank Mayo as John Oxford
Edna Murphy as Doris Henry
Wallace MacDonald as Wallace Towers
Jack Curtis as Pete Scarr
Andrew Arbuckle as Ham Thomas
Ruth Royce as College Kate
Louis Durham as Siwash Sam
Jack Walters as Wilk O'Malley
Scott Turner as Jones
Martin Best as Broome
Tote Du Crow as Indian Guide

References

External links

1922 films
1920s English-language films
Silent American drama films
1922 drama films
Universal Pictures films
Films directed by Lambert Hillyer
American silent feature films
American black-and-white films
1920s American films